The 2002 FIBA Europe Under-18 Championship was an international basketball  competition held in Germany in 2002.

Final ranking

1. 

2. 

3. 

4. 

5. 

6. 

7. 

8. 

9. 

10. 

11. 

12.

Awards

External links
FIBA Archive

FIBA U18 European Championship
2002–03 in European basketball
2002–03 in German basketball
International youth basketball competitions hosted by Germany